Serghei Bobrov (born 7 September 1991) is a Moldovan footballer who plays as a midfielder for FC Florești in the Moldovan National Division.

Career

Dinamo-Auto
In July 2015, Bobrov moved to Dinamo-Auto on a free transfer. He made his league debut for the club on 2 August 2015, coming on as a late substitute for Andrei Bugneac in a 0–0 draw with Zaria.

References

External links
Serghei Bobrov at Flash Score

1991 births
Living people
FC Rapid Ghidighici players
FC Academia Chișinău players
FC Dinamo-Auto Tiraspol players
Moldovan Super Liga players
Moldovan footballers
Association football midfielders
FC Florești players